Zanda Martens (born 1 October 1984) is a Latvian-German politician of the Social Democratic Party (SPD) who has been serving as member of the Bundestag and since 2021.

Political career
Martens became a member of the Bundestag in the 2021 elections, representing the Düsseldorf I district. In parliament, she has been serving on the Committee on Legal Affairs and chairing its Subcommittee on European Law. She is her parliamentary group’s rapporteur on passengers’ rights.

In addition to her committee assignments, Martens has been an alternate member of the German delegation to the NATO Parliamentary Assembly since 2022. In this capacity, she has been serving on the Economics and Security Committee and its Subcommittee on Transition and Development.

Within her parliamentary group, Martens belongs to the Parliamentary Left, a left-wing movement.

Other activities
 Düsseldorf Airport, Member of the Supervisory Board (since 2022)
 IG Metall, Member (since 2011)

References 

Living people
1984 births
Social Democratic Party of Germany politicians
21st-century German politicians
Members of the Bundestag 2021–2025
21st-century German women politicians